Rice Lake High School is a four-year public high school located in Rice Lake, Wisconsin. Rice Lake High School is a part of the Rice Lake Area School District.

School overview 
The history of Rice Lake High School can be traced back to 1882. Rice Lake High School also has more than 250 staff members.

Demographics 
RLHS is 88 percent white, four percent Hispanic, two percent Asian, and one percent black. Four percent of students identify as a part of two or more races.

Athletics 
Rice Lake High School competes in the Big Rivers Conference for athletics. It has teams for football, cross country, golf, swimming, tennis, volleyball, gymnastics, wrestling, basketball, hockey, baseball, softball, track and field, and soccer. Other schools in the Big Rivers Conference are Chippewa Falls High School, Hudson High School, Eau Claire Memorial, Eau Claire North, Menomonie High School, and River Falls High School. Rice Lake High School sports teams were originally in the Heart of the North Conference in 1929. In 1986, football entered the Big Rivers Conference, along with hockey in 1988. All sports entered into the Big Rivers Conference in 1989.

The boys basketball team won 15 conference championships during the Heart of the North era, and 8 championships since joining the Big Rivers Conference. The boys hockey team has won 4 championships. The football team has won one conference championship.

References

External links
 Rice Lake High School official website
 Rice Lake Area School District official website

Public high schools in Wisconsin
1882 establishments in Wisconsin
Education in Barron County, Wisconsin
Educational institutions established in 1882